Fissurella alabastrites is a species of sea snail, a marine gastropod mollusk in the family Fissurellidae, the keyhole limpets.

Distribution
Fissurella alabastrites is found in the waters around Cape Verde and Sierra Leone.

Description
The size of the shell varies between 12 mm and 44 mm.

References

 Rolán E., 2005. Malacological Fauna From The Cape Verde Archipelago. Part 1, Polyplacophora and Gastropoda.

External links
 

Fissurellidae
Molluscs of the Atlantic Ocean
Gastropods of Cape Verde
Invertebrates of West Africa
Gastropods described in 1849